Wijnand is a given name. Notable people with the name include:

Wijnand van Beveren (1911–2003), Dutch sprinter
Wijnand Duyvendak (born 1957), Dutch politician
Johan Wijnand van Goor (c. 1650 – 1704), Dutch general in the Nine Years' War and the War of Spanish Succession
Wijnand Otto Jan Nieuwenkamp (1874–1950), Dutch multi-faceted autodidact
Wijnand Nuijen (1813–1839), Dutch painter and printmaker who specialised in landscapes
Wijnand Ott (born 1955), Dutch musician
Wijnand van der Sanden (born 1953), Dutch archaeologist and prehistorian

Dutch masculine given names